The 2010 Against All Odds was a professional wrestling pay-per-view (PPV) event produced by the Total Nonstop Action Wrestling (TNA) promotion, which took place on February 14, 2010 at the TNA Impact! Zone in Orlando, Florida. It was the sixth event under the Against All Odds chronology and the second event of the 2010 TNA PPV scheduled.

In October 2017, with the launch of the Global Wrestling Network, the event became available to stream on demand. It would later be available on Impact Plus in May 2019.

Storylines

Against All Odds featured nine professional wrestling matches that involved different wrestlers from pre-existing scripted feuds and storylines. Wrestlers were portrayed as villains, heroes or less distinguishable characters in the scripted events that build tension and culminate into a wrestling match or series of matches.

Results

Tournament bracket
8 Card Stud Tournament for a shot at the TNA World Heavyweight Championship at Lockdown.

See also
2010 in professional wrestling

References

External links
Against All Odds 2010.com
TNA Wrestling.com

Impact Wrestling Against All Odds
2010 in professional wrestling in Florida
Professional wrestling shows in Orlando, Florida
February 2010 events in the United States
2010 Total Nonstop Action Wrestling pay-per-view events